is a Japanese musician, best known as the leader and bassist of the rock band L'Arc-en-Ciel. He was formerly known by the stage name tetsu and he started using his birth name professionally on December 1, 2009. While in L'Arc-en-Ciel his name is styled as tetsuya, whereas in his solo work it is styled as TETSUYA.

He also does backup vocals in L'Arc-en-Ciel and has composed many of the band's songs, including "Link", "Ready Steady Go", "Finale", "Driver's High", "Stay Away", "Pieces" and "Good Luck My Way". In 2001 he started a solo career under the name TETSU69 (1969 is his birth year). From 2005 to 2006 he was a support member of Morrie's solo project Creature Creature.

Playing style 
Tetsuya plays with a melodic style. Many of L'Arc-en-Ciel's songs involve him playing counter melodies with guitarist Ken while still holding a groove with the drums. Tetsuya's composing can be seen as more "poppish" as compared to Ken's who has a heavier and sometimes bluesy approach. He frequently uses slides, hammer-ons, and pull-offs in his playing.

He plays with a pick most of the time, but uses finger style occasionally when the song calls for it, such as in "Winter Fall" , "Jojoushi" , "XXX" and "Mirai Sekai". In a few songs he can be heard using the slap style of playing, such as in the L'Arc songs "The Nepenthes" and "Twinkle, Twinkle". Tetsuya has also used distortion, such as in "Stay Away" and "Butterfly's Sleep".

Tetsuya primarily plays a 5 string bass since L'Arc-en-Ciel's 15th anniversary, but is known to occasionally use 6 strings. Such as in "Neo Universe", "Time Goes On", "Get Out from the Shell" where he plays lead melody. In "Perfect Blue" he used a 6 string baritone guitar (an electric guitar between the range of a bass and standard electric guitar). Tetsuya also uses a guitar/bass double neck in the song "Trust".

Even though Tetsuya is endorsed by ESP Guitars and has several signature models, he has used his Zon bass for most of his recording work. Tetsuya is an avid collector of basses and guitars,  owning over 120 basses and more than 20 guitars.

Tetsuya now also endorses Lakland basses and his signature model is the US Series 55-69 tetsuya. He was seen using variations of this bass at the band's recent 20th anniversary concerts in aid of the great Japanese earthquake and tsunami tragedy.

Discography

Singles

EP

Albums

DVD / Blu-ray

Other releases

References

External links
 TETSUYA Official website

L'Arc-en-Ciel members
Ki/oon Music artists
Japanese rock bass guitarists
Japanese male singer-songwriters
Japanese singer-songwriters
Japanese male rock singers
Visual kei musicians
Japanese alternative rock musicians
Musicians from Shiga Prefecture
1969 births
Living people
Male bass guitarists